Sanidhya Hurkat (born 31 July 1999) is an Indian cricketer. He made his List A debut for Chhattisgarh in the 2017–18 Vijay Hazare Trophy on 5 February 2018. He made his Twenty20 debut on 18 January 2021, for Chhattisgarh in the 2020–21 Syed Mushtaq Ali Trophy. He made his first-class debut on 17 February 2022, for Chhattisgarh in the 2021–22 Ranji Trophy.

References

External links
 

1999 births
Living people
Indian cricketers
Place of birth missing (living people)
Chhattisgarh cricketers